Andrew Michael Harrison (born October 28, 1994) is an American professional basketball player for Merkezefendi Bld. Denizli Basket of the Turkish Basketball Super League (BSL). He was considered one of the top recruits for 2013. He attended Travis High School in Richmond, Texas, and played college basketball for the University of Kentucky along with his twin brother, Aaron Harrison.

High school career

Harrison was widely regarded as a top five player in the class of 2013 with Andrew Wiggins, Jabari Parker, Julius Randle, and twin brother Aaron. On March 9, 2013, Harrison helped the Fort Bend Travis Tigers defeat South Grand Prairie 46–38 to win the Class 5A state title in Texas. The Tigers finished #16 in the final ESPN 25 Power Rankings. Fort Bend Travis had lost in the Class 5A state title game the year before to Flower Mound Marcus.

Harrison played in both the 2013 Jordan Brand Classic and the 2013 McDonald's All-American Boys Game.

College career
In his two-year career at Kentucky, Harrison averaged 10.1 points, 2.7 rebounds and 3.8 assists in 79 games. Harrison and his brother, Aaron, helped lead Kentucky to successive Final Fours in 2014 and 2015, but came up empty handed both times after losing in the 2014 title game to Connecticut and 2015 the semi-finals to Wisconsin.

On April 9, 2015, Harrison declared for the NBA draft, forgoing his final two years of college eligibility. He was joined alongside his twin brother Aaron and fellow Kentucky teammates Karl-Anthony Towns, Willie Cauley-Stein, Trey Lyles, Devin Booker, and Dakari Johnson.

Professional career

Iowa Energy (2015–2016)
On June 25, 2015, Harrison was selected with the 44th overall pick by the Phoenix Suns in the 2015 NBA draft. His rights were then traded to the Memphis Grizzlies in exchange for Jon Leuer. He joined the Grizzlies for the 2015 NBA Summer League and averaged 5.4 points, 2.0 rebounds and 3.0 assists in five games. On October 31, 2015, he was acquired by the Iowa Energy of the NBA Development League, the affiliate team of the Grizzlies. He made his professional debut for the Energy on November 14 in a 98–95 win over the Sioux Falls Skyforce, recording 11 points and seven assists in 29 minutes. On February 16, 2016, he scored a season-high 36 points in a 115–105 loss to the Canton Charge. In 46 games for Iowa in 2015–16, he averaged 18.5 points, 4.3 rebounds, 4.9 assists and 1.5 steals per game.

Memphis Grizzlies (2016–2018)
After re-joining the Memphis Grizzlies for the 2016 NBA Summer League, Harrison signed a multi-year deal with the team on July 12, 2016. On November 30, 2016, he scored a career-high 21 points in a 120–105 loss to the Toronto Raptors. He made his debut in NBA playoffs on April 15, 2017, scoring 10 points in just under 20 minutes off the bench in a 111–82 loss to the San Antonio Spurs.

On February 7, 2018, Harrison scored a career-high 23 points in a 92–88 loss to the Utah Jazz. A week later, he set a new career high with 28 points in a 121–114 loss to the Oklahoma City Thunder. Harrison missed nine games in March 2018 due to a right wrist injury.

On November 1, 2018, Harrison was waived by the Grizzlies.

Cleveland Cavaliers (2018)
On November 9, 2018, Harrison signed a two-way contract with the Cleveland Cavaliers. He was waived by the Cavaliers on December 2, 2018.

New Orleans Pelicans (2018–2019)
On December 5, 2018, Harrison signed a two-way contract with the New Orleans Pelicans. He was waived by the Pelicans on January 8, 2019.

Khimki (2019)
On February 27, 2019, Harrison signed with Russian club Khimki for the rest of the 2018–19 season.

Santa Cruz Warriors (2019–2020)
On September 5, 2019, Harrison signed with the Golden State Warriors. On October 19, 2019, the Warriors released Harrison. He ultimately landed on the roster of the Warriors' G League affiliate, the Santa Cruz Warriors. He averaged 15.5 points, 5.1 assists, 3.8 rebounds and 1.2 steals per game.

Beijing Royal Fighters (2020–2021)
After his stint with the Santa Cruz Warriors, Harrison signed with the Chinese team Beijing Royal Fighters. In his first game, he recorded 11 points and 5 rebounds in a winning effort against the Qingdao Eagles.

Windy City Bulls (2022)
On January 10, 2022, Harrison was traded from the Santa Cruz Warriors to the Windy City Bulls. However, he was waived on February 10 after a season-ending injury.

Merkezefendi Belediyesi Denizli Basket (2022–present)
On July 31, 2022, he has signed with Merkezefendi Bld. Denizli Basket of the Turkish Basketball Super League (BSL).

NBA career statistics

Regular season

|-
| style="text-align:left;"| 
| style="text-align:left;"| Memphis
| 72 || 18 || 20.5 || .325 || .276 || .763 || 1.9 || 2.8 || .7 || .3 || 5.9
|-
| style="text-align:left;"| 
| style="text-align:left;""| Memphis
| 56 || 46 || 23.7 || .422 || .331 || .780 || 2.3 || 3.2 || .7 || .5 || 9.5
|-
| style="text-align:left;"| 
| style="text-align:left;""| Memphis
| 1 || 0 || 5.0 || .500 || .000 || .000 || .0 || .0 || .0 || .0 || 2.0
|-
| style="text-align:left;"| 
| style="text-align:left;""| Cleveland
| 10 || 0 || 14.4 || .308 || .214 || 1.000 || 1.5 || 1.7 || .4 || .2 || 4.3
|- class="sortbottom"
| style="text-align:center;" colspan="2"| Career
| 139 || 64 || 21.2 || .375 || .297 || .780 || 2.0 || 2.8 || .7 || .4 || 7.2

Playoffs

|-
| style="text-align:left;"| 2017
| style="text-align:left;"| Memphis
| 6 || 0 || 19.8 || .448 || .385 || .889 || 1.8 || 2.2 || .5 || .2 || 6.5
|- class="sortbottom"
| style="text-align:center;" colspan="2"| Career
| 6 || 0 || 19.8 || .448 || .385 || .889 || 1.8 || 2.2 || .5 || .2 || 6.5

References

External links

NBA D-League profile
Kentucky Wildcats bio

1994 births
Living people
21st-century African-American sportspeople
African-American basketball players
American expatriate basketball people in Russia
American men's basketball players
Basketball players from San Antonio
BC Khimki players
Cleveland Cavaliers players
Iowa Energy players
Kentucky Wildcats men's basketball players
McDonald's High School All-Americans
Memphis Grizzlies players
Merkezefendi Belediyesi Denizli Basket players
New Orleans Pelicans players
People from Fort Bend County, Texas
Phoenix Suns draft picks
Point guards
Santa Cruz Warriors players
Sportspeople from the Houston metropolitan area
American twins
Twin sportspeople